A list of films produced in Hong Kong in 2010:

2010

References

External links
 IMDB list of Hong Kong films
 Hong Kong films of 2010 at HKcinemamagic.com

2010
Films
Hong Kong